The Northwest Conference (NWC) is an athletic conference which competes in the NCAA's Division III.  Member teams are located in the states of Oregon and Washington. It was known as the Pacific Northwest Conference from 1926 to 1984.

History

The NWC was formed in 1926, making it one of the oldest continuously existing athletics conferences in the western United States. For 60 years, the Northwest Conference sponsored sports exclusively for men, but in 1984 it joined with the Women's Conference of Independent Colleges to become the Northwest Conference of Independent Colleges, shortening the name to its current moniker in 1996 when it joined the NCAA.

The charter members included Willamette University, Pacific University, Whitman College, the College of Puget Sound (now the University of Puget Sound), Linfield College and the College of Idaho. In 1931, Albany College joined, left in 1938, and re-joined in 1949 using its present name of Lewis & Clark College. Pacific Lutheran University was added in 1965, and Whitworth University in 1970. In 1978, the College of Idaho dropped out of the conference. Whitworth also left in 1984, but then returned in 1988. In 1996, George Fox University joined when the conference moved to the NCAA and Puget Sound re-joined in that same year since 1948. From 2006 to 2010, Menlo College was also a part of the conference as an associate member in football.

The College of Idaho reinstated its football program in 2014 after a 37-year hiatus and joined the Frontier Conference for football. C of I is now a member of the NAIA's Cascade Collegiate Conference for other sports. Whitworth left the NWC in 1984 but returned in 1988. George Fox University and Seattle University joined the conference in 1997. Seattle dropped out again in 1999 to become members of NCAA Division II. Menlo College joined the conference in 2005 as a football-only member.

Chronlogical timeline
 1926 - The NWC was founded as the Pacific Northwest Conference (PNWC). Charter members include the College of Idaho, Linfield College, Pacific University, the College of Puget Sound (now the University of Puget Sound), Whitman College and Willamette University, effective beginning the 1926-27 academic year.
 1931 - Albany College (now Lewis & Clark College) joined the PNWC, effective in the 1931-32 academic year.
 1938 - Lewis & Clark left the PNWC, effective after the 1937-38 academic year.
 1948 - Puget Sound left the PNWC, effective after the 1947-48 academic year.
 1949 - Lewis & Clark re-joined back to the PNWC, effective in the 1949-50 academic year.
 1965 - Pacific Lutheran College (now Pacific Lutheran University) joined the PNWC, effective in the 1965-66 academic year.
 1970 - Whitworth College (now Whitworth University) joined the PNWC, effective in the 1970-71 academic year.
 1978 - The College of Idaho left the PNWC, effective after the 1977-78 academic year.
 1984 - Whitworth left the PNWC, effective after the 1983-84 academic year.
 1984 - The PNWC merged with the Women's Conference of Independent Colleges (WCIC) to become the Northwest Conference of Independent Colleges (NCIC), therefore adding women's sports in the conference, effective in the 1984-85 academic year.
 1988 - Whitworth re-joined back to the NCIC, effective in the 1988-89 academic year.
 1995 - George Fox College (now George Fox University) joined the NCIC, effective in the 1995-96 academic year.
 1996 - Puget Sound re-joined back to the NCIC, effective in the 1996-97 academic year.
 1996 - The NCIC has rebranded its name to become the Northwest Conference (NWC), effective in the 1996-97 academic year.
 1996 - The NWC has joined full membership in the Division III ranks of the National Collegiate Athletic Association (NCAA) after years spent in the National Association of Intercollegiate Athletics (NAIA), effective in the 1996-97 academic year.
 1997 - Seattle University joined the NWC, effective in the 1997-98 academic year.
 1999 - Seattle left the NWC to join the NCAA Division II ranks and the Pacific West Conference (PacWest), effective after the 1998-99 academic year.
 2006 - Menlo College joined the NWC as an associate member for football, effective in the 2006 fall season (2006-07 academic year).
 2011 - Menlo left the NWC as an associate member for football, effective after the 2010 fall season (2010-11 academic year).

Member schools

Current members
The NWC currently has nine full members, all are private schools:

Notes

Former members
The NWC had two former full members, which both were private schools:

Former associate members
The NWC had one former associate member, which was also a private school:

Notes

Membership timeline

Sports sponsored

The Northwest Conference sponsors championships in baseball, basketball, cross country, football, golf, soccer, softball, swimming, tennis, track and field, and volleyball.

All Sports Trophy
Each year the NWC awards one of its member institutions the NWC All Sports Trophy.  In each sport the Conference Champion is awarded 18 points, second place is awarded 16 points, and so on.  The school with the most points at the conclusion of the academic year wins the trophy.  Football, women's volleyball, men's and women's cross country, men's and women's soccer, men's and women's swimming, men's and women's basketball, men's and women's tennis, men's and women's golf, men's baseball, women's softball, and men's and women's track and field are the 18 sports in which points are awarded.

Most recently, Whitworth won the NWC All Sports Trophy for 2017-18, their twelfth overall and eleventh in a row. Pacific Lutheran has won the award 15 times, more than any other school. Linfield has won the trophy three times while Puget Sound has won it twice.

National championships

† - Whitworth was not a member of the NWC until 1970.

Football champions

1926 – College of Idaho
1927 – College of Idaho
1928 – Whitman
1929 – Willamette
1930 – Whitman
1931 – Whitman
1932 – Puget Sound
1933 – Puget Sound
1934 – Willamette
1935 – Linfield and Willamette
1936 – Willamette
1937 – Willamette
1938 – Pacific (OR) and Willamette
1939 – Pacific
1940 – Willamette
1941 – Willamette
1942 – Willamette
1943 – No champion
1944 – No champion
1945 – No champion

1946 – Willamette
1947 – Willamette
1948 – College of Idaho
1949 – College of Idaho, Lewis & Clark, and Pacific (OR)
1950 – Lewis & Clark
1951 – Lewis & Clark and Pacific (OR)
1952 – Lewis & Clark and Pacific (OR)
1953 – College of Idaho
1954 – College of Idaho, Lewis & Clark, and Willamette
1955 – College of Idaho and Lewis & Clark
1956 – Linfield
1957 – Linfield
1958 – Willamette
1959 – Willamette
1960 – Willamette
1961 – Linfield
1962 – Linfield
1963 – Lewis & Clark
1964 – Linfield
1965 – Linfield

1966 – Lewis & Clark
1967 – Lewis & Clark, Linfield, and Willamette
1968 – Willamette
1969 – Lewis & Clark, Linfield, Pacific Lutheran, and Whitman
1970 – Linfield
1971 – Linfield
1972 – Linfield
1973 – Pacific Lutheran
1974 – Linfield
1975 – Linfield, Pacific Lutheran, and Whitworth (WA)
1976 – Linfield
1977 – Linfield
1978 – Linfield
1979 – Pacific Lutheran
1980 – Linfield
1981 – Pacific Lutheran
1982 – Linfield
1983 – Pacific Lutheran
1984 – Linfield

References

External links